Human Molecular Genetics is a semimonthly peer reviewed scientific journal published by the Oxford University Press. It covers all topics related to human molecular genetics. In addition, two "special review" issues are published each year. The editor-in-chief is CHaris Eng (Case Western Reserve University). The journal was established in 1992.

Abstracting and indexing

The journal is abstracted and indexed in:

According to the Journal Citation Reports, the journal has a 2020 impact factor of 6.150.

References

External links

Oxford University Press academic journals
Biweekly journals
Publications established in 1992
English-language journals
Genetics journals